Glyphodes callipona is a moth in the family Crambidae. It was described by Turner in 1908. It is found in Australia, where it has been recorded from Queensland.

Adults have translucent white wings with sinuous darker yellow bands.

References

Moths described in 1908
Glyphodes